Estée Lauder (July 1, 1908 – April 24, 2004) was an American businesswoman. She co-founded her eponymous cosmetics company with her husband, Joseph Lauter (later Lauder). Lauder was the only woman on Time magazine's 1998 list of the 20 most influential business geniuses of the 20th century.

Early life and education
Lauder was born in Corona, Queens, New York City, the second child born to Rose Schotz and Max Mentzer. Lauder's claims of descent from European aristocracy were discredited in a biography, Estée Lauder: Beyond the Magic (1985) by Lee Israel; her New York Times obituary observed 'she was a New Yorker and not an aristocrat at all', notwithstanding 'the mythmaking that is so much of the magic of the beauty industry'. Her 'favourite story was that she had been brought up by her Viennese mother in fashionable Flushing, Long Island, in a sumptuous home with stables, a chauffeured car and an Italian nurse.'

In actuality, her mother Rose emigrated from Hungary to the United States in 1898 with her five children to join her husband, Abraham Rosenthal. But, in 1905, she married Max Mentzer, a shopkeeper who had also immigrated to the United States in the 1890s. When their daughter was born, they wanted to name her , after her mother's favorite Hungarian aunt, but decided at the last minute to keep the name "Josephine", which they had agreed upon. However, the baby's nickname became "Estee", the name she would grow up using and responding to. Eventually, when she launched her perfume empire with her husband, she added an accent mark to make her name look French and began pronouncing it the way her father had in his Hungarian accent.

Lauder graduated from Newtown High School in Elmhurst, Queens, New York, and much of her childhood was spent trying to make ends meet. Like most of her eight siblings, she worked at the family's hardware store, where she got her first taste of business, entrepreneurship, and what it takes to be a successful retailer. Her childhood dream was to become an actress with her "name in lights, flowers and handsome men".

When Lauder grew older, she agreed to help her uncle, Dr. John Schotz, with his business. Schotz was a chemist, and his company, New Way Laboratories, sold beauty products such as creams, lotions, rouge, and fragrances. She became more interested in his business than her father's. She was fascinated watching her uncle create his products. He also taught her how to wash her face and do facial massages. After graduating from high school, she focused on her uncle's business.

Career
Lauder named one of her uncle's blends Super Rich All-Purpose Cream, and began selling the preparation to her friends. She sold creams like Six-In-One cold cream and Dr. Schotz's Viennese Cream to beauty shops, beach clubs and resorts. One day, as she was getting her hair done at the House of Ash Blondes, the salon's owner Florence Morris asked Lauder about her perfect skin. Soon, Estée returned to the beauty parlor to hand out four of her uncle's creams and demonstrate their use. Morris was so impressed that she asked Lauder to sell her products at Morris's new salon.

In 1953, Lauder introduced her first fragrance, Youth-Dew, a bath oil that doubled as a perfume. Instead of using French perfumes by the drop behind each ear, women began using Youth-Dew by the bottle in their bath water. In the first year, it sold 50,000 bottles; by 1984, the figure had risen to 150 million.

Lauder was a subject of a 1985 TV documentary, Estée Lauder: The Sweet Smell of Success. Explaining her success, she said, "I have never worked a day in my life without selling. If I believe in something, I sell it, and I sell it hard."

Awards and honors
Lauder received the Knight class of the Legion of Honour from the Consul General of France, Gerard Causer. She was the first woman to receive the Chevalier Commendation this year, on January 16, 1978. She was inducted to the Junior Achievement U.S. Business Hall of Fame in 1988. She received the Presidential Medal of Freedom in 2004.

Personal life
Estée met Joseph Lauter when she was in her early twenties. On January 15, 1930, they married. Their surname was later changed from Lauter to Lauder. Their first child, Leonard, was born March 19, 1933. The couple separated then divorced in 1939 and she moved to Florida, but they remarried in 1942. Their second son, Ronald, was born in 1944. Estée and Joseph Lauder remained married until his death in 1982, and she later regretted her divorce, saying that she married young and assumed that she had missed out on life but soon found out that she had the "sweetest husband in the world".

Leonard became the chief executive of Estée Lauder and then chairman of the board. Ronald was a Deputy Assistant Secretary of Defense in the Reagan administration and was U.S. Ambassador to Austria in 1986–87. As of 2021, he is the president of the World Jewish Congress.

Death
Lauder died of cardiopulmonary arrest on April 24, 2004, aged 95, at her home in Manhattan.

See also

 Estée Lauder Companies
 Lauder family

References

Further reading
 Alpern, Sara, "Estee Lauder," Jewish Women: A Comprehensive Historical Encyclopedia
 Kent, Jacqueline C. (2003), Business Builders in Cosmetics, The Oliver Press, 
 The Editors of Perseus Publishing (2003), The Big Book of Business Quotations, Basic Books, 
 Lauder, Estée. Estée: A Success Story. New York: Random House, 1985.  
 Epstein, Rachel S. Estée Lauder: Beauty Business Success. New York: Franklin Watts, 2000.  
 Koehn, Nancy F. Brand New: How Entrepreneurs Earned Consumers' Trust from Wedgwood to Dell. Boston: Harvard Business School Press, 2001.   "Part 2. The Present. Chapter 5. Estée Lauder." pp. 137–200.

External links
Biography page for Estee Lauder at IMDb

1908 births
2004 deaths
Age controversies
American cosmetics businesspeople
American people of Hungarian-Jewish descent
American people of Czech-Jewish descent
American retail chief executives
American women chief executives
Businesspeople from Queens, New York
Cosmetics people
History of cosmetics
Lauder family
Newtown High School alumni
People from Corona, Queens
Presidential Medal of Freedom recipients
American chief executives of fashion industry companies
Chevaliers of the Légion d'honneur